The Roman Catholic Archdiocese of Jaro is an archdiocese of the Catholic Church headquartered in Jaro, Iloilo City, the Philippines. It is based with the Jaro Cathedral (officially the Metropolitan Cathedral of St. Elizabeth of Hungary, also the National Shrine of Our Lady of Candles) as its seat.     
 
The Archdiocese of Jaro is one of the oldest episcopal sees in the country. It was established as a visita of Oton on March 3, 1575 and as a parish in 1587. It was later elevated to a diocese by a papal bull of Pope Pius IX on May 27, 1865, according to a document signed by Archbishop Gregorio Martinez, then archbishop of Manila.  The diocese was created from the territory of the Archdiocese of Manila.  Its first bishop was Mariano Cuartero, a Dominican missionary in the Philippines, who took possession of the diocese, on April 25, 1868. It is also one of the largest episcopal sees during the Spanish colonial era encompassing the whole island of Panay (Aklan, Antique, Capiz, Guimaras and Iloilo provinces), Mindoro, Romblon, Negros (Negros Occidental and Negros Oriental provinces), Palawan, Davao, Sulu, Cotabato and Zamboanga Peninsula as part of its jurisdiction. 

On April 10, 1910, it lost some of its territories to the newly created Diocese of Zamboanga and Apostolic Prefecture of Palawan. Negros Oriental (Dumaguete) was also its part but became a separate diocese under Cebu. Later, three other ecclesiastical jurisdictions were established from its territory: the Diocese of Bacolod (15 July 1932), Apostolic Prefecture of Mindoro (2 July 1936), and Roman Catholic Diocese of Capiz (27 January 1951).

On April 28, 1934, Pope Pius XI promulgated an apostolic constitution with the incipit Romanorum Pontificum semper separating the dioceses of Cebu, Calbayog, Jaro, Bacolod, Zamboanga and Cagayan de Oro from the ecclesiastical province of Manila. The same constitution elevated the diocese of Cebu into an archdiocese while placing all the newly separated dioceses under a new ecclesiastical province with Cebu as the new metropolitan see.

On 29 June 1951, it was raised as a Metropolitan Archdiocese by Pope Pius XII. On 24 March 1962, it lost some territory to establish the Territorial Prelature (now Diocese) of San Jose de Antique.

At present, the Archdiocese of Jaro covers the provinces of Iloilo and Guimaras, an island off Iloilo. Suffragan dioceses include the Roman Catholic Diocese of Bacolod, the Diocese of San Carlos, and the Roman Catholic Diocese of Kabankalan, all in the province Negros Occidental and the Roman Catholic Diocese of San Jose de Antique on the island of Panay.

As of the year 2004, out of a population of 2,232,931, 92.00% or 2,054,296 are Catholic, making Jaro the eighth-largest diocese in the Philippines. In 2015, the archdiocese has 92 parishes, 256 priests (173 diocesan, 83 religious), 644 lay religious (121 brothers, 523 sisters), 65 seminarians.  In the same year, the Catholic population numbers 2,641,965 Catholics or 83.1% of 3,177,462 total residents of its entire territory covering 5,304 km². The province is predominantly rural with 72.7 percent of the total population residing in rural areas and only 27.3 percent in urban area. Agriculture, forestry and fishing are the leading major industries.

Its titular patron saint is Elizabeth of Hungary, whose feast is celebrated on November 17.

History

The precursor of the Archdiocese of Jaro dates back when it was founded in 1587 as a Roman Catholic parish by the Spanish colonists. The diocese of Jaro whose patron saint is Elizabeth of Hungary was officially and formally established by virtue of the Papal bull "Qui Ab Initio" of Pope Pius IX. The bull was issued in Rome on May 27, 1865. On October 10, 1867 the decree took effect and Jaro was made an Episcopal See, according to the document signed by D. Gregorio Meliton Martinez, then archbishop of Manila and executor-delegate of the decree. It is worth noting that this "decretum executorium" was also signed by Jose Burgos, Pro-Secretary, a secular priest who became one of the outstanding martyr-heroes of the country.
Jaro was separated from the now Archdiocese of Cebu and became a suffragan diocese of the Archdiocese of Manila. Its territories at creation comprised the islands of Panay, (now composed of the provinces of Iloilo, Capiz, Antique and Aklan), Guimaras, Negros (now the twin provinces of Negros Occidental and Negros Oriental), Romblon and Palawan, as well as the provinces of Cotabato, Zamboanga, Davao and Sulu of Mindanao. Mariano Cuartero became its first bishop on April 25, 1868.

In the 20th century the diocese was further divided to form new ecclesiastical jurisdictions. Zamboanga was made a separate diocese in 1910, while Palawan was made an apostolic prelature in the same year; then Bacolod in 1933, Capiz in 1951 and finally the Prelature of San Jose, Antique in 1962 as suffragans.

Concurrently with the elevation of Jaro to an archdiocese, the first Filipino bishop, Jose Maria Cuenco, was raised to the rank of metropolitan archbishop, thereby making him the first archbishop of Jaro.

On January 17, 1976, Pope Paul VI elevated Capiz to the rank of archdiocese, with the dioceses of Romblon and Kalibo as its suffragans. The Archdiocese of Jaro was left with the dioceses of Bacolod (which eventually was divided into three dioceses, to wit, Bacolod, San Carlos, and Kabankalan) and San Jose de Antique as its suffragans.

On 21 February 1981, Pope John Paul II visited the archdiocese and crowned the image of Nuestra Señora de la Candelaria at the facade of Jaro Cathedral, the first Marian image crowned personally without a papal legate by a pope.

Last 2012, the relics of Saint Clare and the pilgrim image of Pedro Calungsod visited the archdiocese.

Last March 15–17, 2013, the pilgrim relics of Therese of the Child Jesus visited the archdiocese a third time.

Coat of Arms

The black eagle and the three red roses refer to Saint Elizabeth of Hungary or of Thuringia, patroness of the Jaro Cathedral. The coconut on a green knoll represents Jaro.

Bishops 
The current archbishop is Jose Romeo O. Lazo. He was born on 23 January 1949 in San Jose de Buenavista, Antique He attended the St. Vincent Ferrer Major Seminary in Jaro, and was ordained a priest on 1 April 1975 in San Jose de Buenavista, Antique. After his ordination, he pursued higher studies at the East Asian Pastoral Institute, Quezon City in and the Institute of Pastoral Theology in Berkeley, California, United States.

In 2003, Lazo was appointed bishop of the Roman Catholic Diocese of Kalibo, and was ordained bishop on 29 December 2003. Pope Benedict XVI appointed him as bishop of the Roman Catholic Diocese of San Jose de Antique in 2009. On 14 February 2018, Pope Francis appointed him as the archbishop of Jaro following the retirement of Archbishop Angel Lagdameo. Lagdameo served the archdiocese for 17 years.

List of bishops and archbishops of Jaro

Affiliated bishops
Living

Jose Romeo O. Lazo (Archbishop: 14 February 2018 – present)
Fernando R. Capalla (Priest: 18 March 1961 to 2 April 1975)
Jose Serofia Palma (Priest: 21 Aug 1976 to 28 Nov 1997)
Emmanuel Celeste Trance (Priest: 17 May 1978 to 14 May 2004)
Gerardo Alimane Alminaza (Former Auxiliary Bishop:29 May 2008 to 14 Sep 2013)

Deceased
Leandro Arrúe Agudo (Bishop: 27 Mar 1885 to 24 Oct 1897)
Teofilo Bastida Camomot (Auxiliary Bishop: 23 Mar 1955 to 10 Jun 1958)
Artemio G. Casas (Archbishop: 11 May 1974 to 25 Oct 1985)
Mariano Cuartero y Medina (Bishop: 20 Sep 1867 to 16 Jul 1884)
José María Cuenco (Auxiliary Bishop: 22 Nov 1941; Bishop: 24 Nov 1945; Archbishop: 29 Jun 1951 to 8 Oct 1972)
Dennis Joseph Dougherty (Bishop: 19 Apr 1908 to 6 Dec 1915)
Andrés Ferrero y Malo de San José (Bishop: 24 Mar 1898 to 27 Oct 1903)
Maurice Patrick Foley (Bishop: 6 Sep 1916 to 7 Aug 1919)
James Paul McCloskey (Bishop: 8 Mar 1920 to 10 Apr 1945)
Juan Nicolasora Nilmar (Auxiliary Bishop: 20 Feb 1959 to 3 Jan 1967)
Alberto Jover Piamonte (Priest: 22 Mar 1958; Auxiliary Bishop: 28 Dec 1974; Archbishop: 2 Apr 1986 to 17 Dec 1998)
Frederick Zadok Rooker (Bishop: 12 Jun 1903 to 20 Sep 1907)
Jaime Lachica Sin (Priest: 3 Apr 1954; Auxiliary Bishop: 10 Feb 1967; Coadjutor Archbishop: 15 Jan 1972; Archbishop: 8 Oct 1972 to 21 Jan 1974)
Angel N. Lagdameo (Archbishop Emeritus: 11 March 2000 to 14 February 2018)

Suffragan dioceses 

Diocese of Bacolod, in northwestern Negros Occidental
Diocese of Kabankalan, in southern Negros Occidental
Diocese of San Carlos, in northeastern Negros Occidental
Diocese of San Jose de Antique, in Antique

See also
Catholic Church in the Philippines

References

External links
Catholic Bishops Conference of the Philippines
Archdiocese of Jaro on the Catholic Encyclopedia
Archdiocese of Jaro on Catholic-Hierarchy.org

Jaro
Archdiocese
Jaro
Jaro
1865 establishments in the Philippines
Religion in Iloilo
Iloilo City